Jure Rupnik is a Slovenian bicycle racer, currently with the DCBank Pro Cycling team.

References

1993 births
Living people
Slovenian male cyclists